The Støre Cabinet is the incumbent government of the Kingdom of Norway, headed by Labour Party leader Jonas Gahr Støre as Prime Minister. The government was appointed by King Harald V on 14 October 2021, following the parliamentary election on 13 September, consisting of the Labour Party and the Centre Party as a minority government.

Members 
On 14 October 2021, Jonas Gahr Støre's cabinet ministers were appointed by King Harald V. The cabinet consists of 19 ministers; one fewer than the previous Solberg cabinet. It has eleven ministers from Labour and eight from Centre, reflecting the parties' numerical strength in Parliament.

The cabinet consists of ten women and nine men, two of whom (Brenna and Vestre) survived the 2011 Norway attacks. At age 28, Emilie Enger Mehl became the youngest person to serve as the minister of justice in the Norwegian government. This is also the third time in Norwegian history that a cabinet has a women-majority.

|}

References 

Cabinet of Norway
Cabinets involving the Labour Party (Norway)
Cabinets involving the Centre Party (Norway)
2021 establishments in Norway
Cabinets established in 2021
Current governments